Hadino Hishongwa 78 years old (born 10 April 1943 at Odibo) is a Namibian former politician. A founding member of SWAPO, Hishongwa was SWAPO's Chief Representative to Scandinavia, West Germany and Austria from 1977-83 during the Namibian War of Independence.

Hishongwa was appointed Deputy Minister of Labour and Human Resources Development upon Independence of Namibia in 1990. In 1995 he was transferred to the Youth and Sport ministry, again as deputy minister. He held this position until 2005.

Hishongwa was a member of the National Assembly of Namibia with SWAPO from the constituent assembly in 1989 until the conclusion of the 3rd National Assembly in 2005. After that Hishongwa was appointed High Commissioner to neighboring Botswana. In April 2011, he was replaced in Botswana by the former ambassador to South Africa, Philemon Kambala.

Hishongwa was previously married to fellow SWAPO activist Ndeutala Angolo, with whom he has two children.

On Heroes' Day 2014 he was conferred the Excellent Order of the Eagle, First Class.

References

1943 births
Living people
SWAPO politicians
Members of the National Assembly (Namibia)
High Commissioners of Namibia to Botswana
Botswana–Namibia relations